Chris Dean (born 15 March 1994) is a Scottish rugby union player who plays for Edinburgh Rugby in the United Rugby Championship.

Background

Dean lifted the Brewin Dolphin Scottish Schools' Cup for Edinburgh Academy in three consecutive seasons: in 2009 (under-15) and as under-18 captain in 2010 and 2011.

He has represented Scotland at every age-grade, and skippered Scotland under-17 through the Wellington Festival in 2011, before his development was fast-tracked on a Scotland 7s elite development player contract in May 2012.

In June 2014, after two years contracted with the 7s, Chris moved on to a first team contract with Edinburgh Rugby, signed as a centre.

On 16 January 2019 Gregor Townsend named seven uncapped players, for his Scotland Six Nations squad. Dean was among those selected.

References

External links 
 http://www.edinburghrugby.org/edinburgh-rugby/player/chris-dean

1994 births
Living people
Scottish rugby union players
People educated at Edinburgh Academy
Edinburgh Rugby players
Scotland international rugby sevens players
Male rugby sevens players
Rugby union centres